Metropol  is a newspaper published in Albania. It is a tabloid style daily published first on 9 May 2004. Metropol is owned by Ing. Alban Xhaferi and its editor is Brahim Shima.

References

Newspapers published in Albania
Albanian-language newspapers